The 1981 Chilean telethon was the fourth version of the solidarity campaign conducted in Chile, which took place on 11 and 12 December 1981. The theme of this version was "Together, Everything is Possible." The poster girl was Ana María Cortés.

For the fourth consecutive year Don Francisco conducted the telethon, which soon would become part of the history of Chile. This version was characterized by the number of artists who supported this cause. The amount raised was CL$ 202,436,220.

Among the controversies of this telethon, was the donation of an ambulance to that institution by the CNI (National Information Centre). According to the book La Era Ochentera (The Eighties Era), the telethon received a call from the CNI, to donate an ambulance, however Ximena Casarejos was not convinced that the CNI representative would make the donation. Eventually the CNI made the donation at 18:30 hours on 12 December 1981.

Sponsors

Artists

Nationals
  José Alfredo Fuentes
  Ginette Acevedo
  Sebastián
  Roberto Valdés
  Juan Carlos Duque
  Pachuco y la Cubanacán
  Bermuda Show
  Andrea Tessa
  Los Luceros del Bailongo
  Eduardo Trujillo
  Carlos Alegría
  Peter Rock
  Patricio Renán
  Jorge Eduardo
  Malibú
  Antonio Gubbins
  Cecilia Echeñique
  Gloria Simonetti
  Óscar Andrade
  Alejandra Álamo
  Juan Antonio Labra
  Mónica De Calixto
  Carlos Vásquez
  Antonio Prieto
  Los Huasos Quincheros
  Florcita Motuda

International entertainers 

  Albert Hammond
  Amparito Jiménez
  Salinka
  Armando Manzanero
  Pablo Abraira
  Valerio
  Francisco
  Julio Bernardo Euson
  Silvana Di Lorenzo
  Las Mellizas del Tango
  Leonor Benedetto
  Ofra Haza
  Nelson Ned
  Julio Iglesias
  Danny Rivera

Comedians 

 Juan Verdaguer
 Jorge Romero "Firulete"
 José Luis Giogia
 Carlos Helo
 Coco Legrand
 Los Morisquetos
 Mino Valdez and company
 Gila
 Ronco Retes

Magazine 

Ali Bongo, English magician
 Ivan Núñez, pianist
 Gloria Benavides, show-woman
 Osvaldo Cuadros, drummer
 Pepe Tapia, magician
 Chicho Azúa fenomímica
 Daniel Lencina, trumpeter

Children's section

 Tia Gabriela
 Tio Memo
 Tía Patricia

Adult's section

 Magie Lay
 Sissi Lobato
 Maripepa Nieto
 Pitica and Bibi Ubilla
 Wendy
 Magaly Acevedo
 Teresita Rouge

Transmission 

 12.10.3.8 TVUN Red del Norte
 UCV Televisión
 Televisión Nacional de Chile
 Teleonce Universidad de Chile
 Corporación de Televisión Universidad Católica de Chile

External links 

Telethon
Chilean telethons